The Kew Mortuary or Dead-House is a small, shed-like building, approximately  and  high, attached to the back of Caxton House, 110 Kew Green (TW9 3AR), just to the east of Kew Bridge on Greyhound Lane facing Westerley Ware. This Victorian  mortuary building retains an original slate slab.

History 

Kew is bordered by the Thames so bodies of drowned people frequently were washed up along its shore. Originally such bodies would be taken to either facilities provided by the local Vestry or more often a local public house, although publicans were not required to receive dead bodies. It was not until the Public Health Act 1848 that local boards of health were enabled to build mortuaries or 'dead-houses'. Under the Sanitary Act 1866 there was still no requirement to build a mortuary, although where one existed corpses of those who died from infectious diseases were required to be taken to the mortuary. The Public Health Act 1872 established sanitary authorities. It was not until the Public Health Act 1875 that the Local Government Board could compel local authorities to provide mortuaries.

Locally, there seems to have been a mortuary or dead-house in Mortlake by 1856. The need for a dead-house at Twickenham under the Sanitary Act 1866 was discussed from 1871 as "in some instances publicans objected to having the bodies brought to their premises"; tenders were submitted in 1875. There was also a mortuary at Hampton Wick and Barnes about the same time and a mortuary in Brentford from about 1870. In Richmond the mortuary seems to have been at the Work House and as late as 1900 the coroner, Mr Braxton Hicks, was describing it as insanitary and a disgrace.

The earliest record for a mortuary at Kew is from 1871, so the mortuary probably dates from the late 1860s. At that time the attached building would have been occupied by Robert Surman, butcher.

The parish of Kew found itself without a parish constable in 1873. They contended that under the Parish Constables Act 1872 it was no longer necessary to appoint one, although at their Court Leet they did appoint a beadle and head-borough, who had the keys of the dead-house. However, he refused to take charge of a body found in the Thames and handed the keys to the police. The police instead called in the parish constable for Richmond.

The police gradually took over powers from the local Parish Constable or Headborough, including the removal of bodies.

The condition of mortuaries 
The deficiencies of the local mortuaries started to become an issue.

In 1869 the dead-house at Kingston was "within a stone's throw of the Market-place... adjoining the graveyard" with "no slab or bench" for the body and described as most horrible.  In 1870 part of the old watch house in Brick Lane (now Union Street), was fitted out as a Dead-house. The Kingston Mortuary in 1880 was described as being in a disgraceful condition, with insufficient light to carry out post-mortems. By 1881 it was being described as "not a fit place in which to place the dead body of a dog, much less that of a human being" by the jury. Even by 1903 the Kingston Mortuary was "formerly a shed for fuel consumed by the church." A new mortuary was opened in Kingston by 1905, but met with criticism.

In 1882 the Local Government Board wrote to the Richmond Vestry advising that "Richmond: The Mortuaries now in existence are not satisfactory. They are far too small and not properly fitted up or ventilated." A committee was set up that by 1883 recommended alterations.

By 1882 members of the inquest jury were expressing their disgust at the state "of the Mortlake parish dead-house", saying that "it is never cleaned out". In 1882 The Rural Sanitary Authority advertised for land in Mortlake and Petersham for mortuaries. In 1886 plans were made for a new mortuary and accommodation for inquests.

Locally, there was no mortuary or ambulance at Ham, and the police had to borrow a cart to take the body to the Crooked Billet pub, where the post-mortem was carried out in the stable. The Coroner,  Braxton Hicks, raised the question in 1885 of a mortuary at Ham and improvements at Kew, saying that the rude provision made for the reception of human remains there was a public scandal. He pointed out where there was no local mortuary the body could in theory be left with the churchwardens, although generally the body was often taken to a public house.  After that bodies from Ham were taken to Kingston until 1905.

Coroner's inquests also started off being in public houses but gradually moved into improved facilities.

The local paper reported in 1885 on carrying out a post mortem at Kew:

The poor state of the mortuaries at Mortlake, Kew and Barnes was discussed again in 1886. It was reported that "no one was in charge of the mortuary at Kew". "More bodies found in the river were brought to the Surrey shore than to the Middlesex side, because on this side they paid the men for taking the bodies out three times as much as they did on the opposite side." The Surrey authorities paid 5 shillings (a crown) for every body recovered, under a statute of George III, while on the Middlesex side it was only half a crown.

In 1896 the old Richmond Vestry Hall, the mortuary was at the rear, was pulled down and replaced by a new Magistrates Court and mortuary. The condition of the Richmond mortuary was again condemned in 1900: "A short time ago there were five bodies in there, and there was not room in the place for them. It was not only a disgrace but most insanitary. His juries complained that they could not view the bodies which had been in the water some time ... owing to the lack of proper accommodation."

Despite the inadequacies of the Kew mortuary it continued in use for the reception of bodies.

The running of the mortuary 
Under the Local Government Act 1894 the powers of the Vestry were transferred to the Richmond Borough Council, including the mortuary. They reported that Mrs Taylor had been paid 5s for cleaning the mortuary and washing the towels, sheets, and stretcher for each corpse taken to the mortuary. She was paid for the seven cases that had occurred since the extension of the Borough.

Bodies from the Thames were collected by a police ambulance stationed in Kew Gardens Road and taken to Kew Mortuary. They were then taken to Richmond in a shell by a local undertaker. There were 5 such cases in 1908 and 4 in 1909.  In 1910 Kew residents again raised the deficiencies of the mortuary, without washing facilities and described by one resident as "smaller than his coal cellar". The police complained that the reason for asking for improved facilities was that the building was dilapidated. The Police did not want to take bodies the 2 miles to Richmond on their ambulance. Rubber sheets were eventually provided for the police to wrap the body.

Final years 
In 1914 the Richmond Health Committee heard about complaints from residents about the use of the mortuary. They agreed that dead bodies should be immediately taken to the Richmond mortuary at Eton Lodge. They therefore purchased a hand ambulance for £3 that would be stored in the mortuary and used by the police.

In 1924 the Kew Commonable Rights Committee asked if the mortuary could be used as a Groundsman's Office and Tool Shed. This was rejected because "the building is still used for the purpose of a Mortuary", but they could build a shed on the site adjoining the Mortuary "formerly used for the purpose of a Urinal and Pound."

The mortuary survived and is currently used as a store room by the Kew Gardens Rotary Club.

Recovery of bodies in the Thames

The parish was responsible for burial, under the Burial of Drowned Persons Act, and a fee of 5 shillings (a crown) was also paid by the parish for the recovery of drowned bodies. After the Princess Alice disaster Woolwich parish applied for reimbursement from the county, which was rejected because the river was not sea. The Act was amended to include "tidal or navigable waters" such as the Thames.

The Police Order 1899
On 1 August 1899 the Metropolitan Police Commissioner, Sir Edward Bradford, issued a new Police Order that "The Police will therefore inform the Overseers of any cases coming under their notice, and will also use every effort to procure the immediate removal by the Overseers of any such dead bodies to the Parish Mortuary." The Police Commissioner issued the order because the police were not paid to remove bodies under the Act. This Police Order had serious consequences when bodies were recovered from the Thames in London and throw some light on the practice.

One of the first cases following the Police Order was the inquest in Lambeth where "In the ordinary course the police would have conveyed it to the mortuary close by, but, owing to the order above referred to, they went in search of the overseers and churchwardens." Thomas Hemmings, an inspector of Thames Police, said "the police had removed bodies themselves for a great many years. ... The custom varied in different parishes. At Pimlico, for instance, the mortuary authorities always removed bodies found in the river, also at Westminster and Poplar." .

The Overseers in parishes along the tidal Thames objected to the new Police Order. As reported by local newspapers.

The coroner, Mr. A. Braxton Hicks, also reported the difficulties.

Braxton Hicks wrote to the Home Secretary, Sir Matthew White Ridley, about the Police Order issued by the Metropolitan Commissioner of Police.

The Coroner and the Kew Beadle
By December the situation was still not clear and that caused a problem for the parish of Kew.

The Kew overseers also wrote to the Home Secretary. Eventually the Commissioner of Police conceded "Unless, therefore, the Overseers or Churchwardens intimate that they desire this duty to be performed by themselves, or by some duly accredited agent on their behalf, the Police are to take steps to ensure the removal of all bodies coming under their notice as promptly as possible".

References 

Kew, London
Buildings and structures in the London Borough of Richmond upon Thames
History of the London Borough of Richmond upon Thames
Kew Green